Blacksburg is a small town in Cherokee County, South Carolina, United States. The population was 1,848 at the 2010 census. The communities of Cherokee Falls, Kings Creek, Cashion Crossroads, Buffalo, and Mount Paran are located near the town.

It is part of the Greenville-Spartanburg-Anderson Combined Statistical Area (CSA) which has a population of 1,478,648 according to 2018 estimates by the U.S. Census Bureau.

History
Located near the northern border of the state, the present-day site of Blacksburg was first settled by a man named Stark. Mr. Stark, who had lived in Charleston, South Carolina prior to moving to the area, had gotten several people to come along with him on an agriculture venture, but this venture would fail. Those who stayed behind named the area "Stark's Folly".

In the late 19th century the Black family, headed by John G. Black, a Confederate veteran, was living in the area and persuaded the C.C. & C. Railroad Company to lay track through the town and build a depot. The town soon became known as "Black's Station" in honor of John G. Black and was incorporated as Black's Station town in 1876. The legal town was renamed "Blacksburg" in 1888.

Major John F. Jones of Massachusetts came to live in Blacksburg when hired as superintendent of the C. C. & C. Railroad. He donated his own money to build a school, hotel (the Cherokee Inn), and several other buildings in Blacksburg. He lived in Blacksburg until 1922, when he was appointed the South Carolina Internal Revenue Collector by the President of the United States.

In the 1890s large amounts of iron ore were found in the area, and many people hoping to make a fortune from mining it flocked to the town. Blacksburg became a boom town, and hotels and saloons were built for the new visitors. The town went by the name "Iron City" for a short time. Because of the "iron rush" the town became quite wealthy. It installed the first electric street lights in Upstate South Carolina and perhaps in the entire state.
The town was renamed in 1888 as "Blacksburg" but still holds the nickname of "Iron City".

The Kings Mountain State Park Historic District was listed on the National Register of Historic Places in 2008.

Geography
Blacksburg is located in northeastern Cherokee County at  (35.120676, -81.516291).

Demographics

2020 census

As of the 2020 United States census, there were 1,889 people, 785 households, and 329 families residing in the town.

2000 census
As of the census of 2000, there were 1,880 people, 785 households, and 503 families residing in the town. The population density was 1,018.8 people per square mile (392.4/km2). There were 911 housing units at an average density of 493.7 per square mile (190.1/km2). The racial makeup of the town was 74.52% White, 23.56% African American, 0.21% Native American, 0.11% Asian, 0.05% Pacific Islander, and 1.54% from two or more races. Hispanic or Latino of any race were 0.53% of the population.

There were 785 households, out of which 31.0% had children under the age of 18 living with them, 40.3% were married couples living together, 19.5% had a female householder with no husband present, and 35.8% were non-families. 32.6% of all households were made up of individuals, and 16.3% had someone living alone who was 65 years of age or older. The average household size was 2.39 and the average family size was 3.04.

In the town, the population was spread out, with 28.2% under the age of 18, 7.8% from 18 to 24, 27.9% from 25 to 44, 21.8% from 45 to 64, and 14.3% who were 65 years of age or older. The median age was 34 years. For every 100 females, there were 80.2 males. For every 100 females age 18 and over, there were 76.6 males.

The median income for a household in the town was $26,453, and the median income for a family was $35,208. Males had a median income of $27,384 versus $21,207 for females. The per capita income for the town was $16,833. About 13.7% of families and 17.4% of the population were below the poverty line, including 20.3% of those under age 18 and 29.4% of those age 65 or over.

Major transportation routes
  Interstate 85 runs northwest of the town, with access from Exits 100 and 102.  There is a South Carolina Welcome Center at milemarker 103.
  US 29 is a two-lane highway that runs through the downtown area and serves as the main street (Cherokee Street). It leads southwest  to downtown Gaffney and northeast  to Grover, North Carolina.
  South Carolina Highway 5 is a four-lane road that passes east of the town center.
  South Carolina Highway 198 is a four-lane road that begins at the north end of the bridge over I-85 at exit 102 and leads north  to Shelby, North Carolina.

Education
Public education in Blacksburg is administered by Cherokee County School District. The district operates Blacksburg Primary School, Blacksburg Elementary School, Blacksburg Middle School, and Blacksburg High School.

Blacksburg has a public library, a branch of the Cherokee County Library System.

Media
The Cherokee Chronicle, a newspaper serving Cherokee County, is published Tuesdays and Thursdays.

Arts and culture
The Iron City Festival was held for the first time in 2006. The festival commemorates the founding of the town and is sponsored by the Blacksburg Business Association, Inc.  Iron City Festival is held the third weekend in April.

The anniversary of the Battle of Kings Mountain is held annually on October 7-8th at the Kings Mountain National Military Park and honors those who fell at the Battle of Kings Mountain during the Revolutionary War.

Notable people 
 Jason Gilfillan, professional baseball player, graduated from Blacksburg High School in 1994
 James Rhyne Killian, 10th president of MIT, from 1948 until 1959
 Mikki Moore, professional basketball player, graduated from Blacksburg High School in 1993
 Judy Rose, director of athletics at UNC Charlotte

References

External links
 Town of Blacksburg official website

Towns in Cherokee County, South Carolina
Towns in South Carolina